Beale is an unincorporated community in Mason County, in the U.S. state of West Virginia.

History
A post office called Beale was established in 1902, and remained in operation until 1916. The community has the name of Colonel Charles Beale, an early settler.

References

Unincorporated communities in Mason County, West Virginia
Unincorporated communities in West Virginia